Materialization may refer to:
 Materialization (paranormal), the creation or appearance of matter from unknown sources
 Materialization, an action involving energy to matter conversion:
 Dematerialization and rematerialization, two theorized stages of teleportation
 Materialization of fantasy environments and partners via the holodeck in the Star Trek series
 Materialization of food and other substances by the Replicator (Star Trek)
 Materialization, creating a materialized view in a relational database
 Materialization, the process of creating an embodiment of an idea, such as a prototype
 Materialize CSS, the responsive front-end CSS library based on Google's Material Design

See also 
 Dematerialization (disambiguation)
 Materiality (disambiguation)